Syncosmia dissographa is a moth in the family Geometridae. It is found on Sulawesi, Borneo, Java and Bali.

The forewings have a bone-white ground colour with brown suffusion.

References

Moths described in 1958
Eupitheciini